Kangpokpi district (Meitei pronunciation: /kāng-pōk-pī/),  is one of the 16 districts in the Indian state of Manipur. It was created in December 2016 from areas in the Sadar Hills region which were previously part of Senapati District.

The district headquarters is located in Kangpokpi. The district was formed from three sub-divisions of Senapati District: Sadar Hills West, Sadar Hills East and Saitu-Gamphazol.

Demographics
At the time of the 2011 census, Kangpokpi district had a population of 193,744. It had a literacy rate of 85% - 89% for males and 80.34% for females. Scheduled Castes and Scheduled Tribes make up 0.37% and 79.76% of the population respectively.

Religion

Christianity is the dominant religion in the district. Almost all tribals are Christian. The non-tribals, mainly Gorkhas are primarily Hindus, with there being some Buddhist Gorkhas.

Languages

At the time of the 2011 census, 42.29% of the population spoke Thadou, 15.96% Nepali, 10.56% Kuki, 5.08% Vaiphei, 5.02% Tangkhul, 3.56% Liangmei, 2.64% Chirr, 2.35% Kom, 2.11% Rongmei, 1.42% Maring, 1.13% Mao and 1.03% Hindi as their first language.

See also 
 List of populated places in Kangpokpi district

Notes

References

External links 
 Official website

 
Districts of Manipur